Courtenay Reece (4 December 1899 – 16 April 1984) was a Barbadian first-class cricketer and cricket umpire. He batted right-handed and was a medium pace bowler who played for Barbados and Oxford University between 1925 and 1930. He stood as umpire in one Test match, West Indies vs. England, in 1935.

See also
 List of Test cricket umpires
 English cricket team in West Indies in 1934–35

References

1899 births
1984 deaths
Barbadian cricketers
Barbados cricketers
Oxford University cricketers
West Indian Test cricket umpires
People from Saint Thomas, Barbados
Alumni of Jesus College, Oxford
Oxfordshire cricketers